APEC Papua New Guinea 2018 was the year-long hosting of Asia-Pacific Economic Cooperation (APEC) meetings in Papua New Guinea.

It was the first time Papua New Guinea hosted the APEC meetings. Australia provided a quarter to a third of the cost  to host the meetings and also helped with logistics and security (G4S). Three cruise ships were chartered through an Australian company to cater to the some 10,000 delegates and guests.

Many of the attendees and delegations had previously attended the 2018 East Asia Summit held from 11 to 15 November in Singapore, hosted by the Chairperson Lee Hsien Loong, the Prime Minister of Singapore. Thereafter, many of the state leaders, including Prime Minister Lee of Singapore, flew from Singapore to Papua New Guinea.

Events

Economic Leaders' Meeting

Attendees
This was the first APEC meeting for Chilean President Sebastián Piñera, Malaysian Prime Minister Mahathir Mohamad, and Australian Prime Minister Scott Morrison, since their inaugurations and appointments on 11 March 2018, 10 May 2018, and 24 August 2018, respectively; Piñera and Mahathir had previously attended multiple APEC meetings in their first term as president and prime minister, respectively. It was also the last APEC meeting for the host Papua New Guinea Prime Minister Peter O'Neill, who stepped down in 29 May 2019. Additionally, this was the last APEC meeting for Malaysian Prime Minister Mohamad and Japanese Prime Minister Shinzo Abe, following their respective resignations in 2020 as the planned 2019 summit was cancelled due to the protests in Chile. While Nguyễn Xuân Phúc attended for the last time as the Prime Minister of Vietnam before he was elected President in 2021.

Five presidents did not attend the summit – Mexican President Enrique Peña Nieto, Peruvian President Martín Vizcarra, Russian President Vladimir Putin, United States President Donald Trump, and Vietnamese President Nguyễn Phú Trọng. Peña Nieto was represented by Mexican Under Secretary of Foreign Trade Juan Carlos Baker, while Vizcarra sent Peruvian Foreign Minister Nestor Popolizio in his place. Putin was represented by former Russian President, now Prime Minister Dmitry Medvedev, while Trump sent Vice President Mike Pence in his place. Nguyễn Phú Trọng was represented by Prime Minister Nguyễn Xuân Phúc respectively.

Invited Attendees
Leaders and representatives of Pacific Island nations were invited by Papua New Guinea to attend the "APEC Leaders' Dialogue with Pacific Island Leaders" on 17 November.

Absence of declaration and aftermath
According to Reuters, "the leaders failed to agree on a communique at a summit in Papua New Guinea on Sunday for the first time in their history as deep divisions between the United States and China over trade and investment stymied cooperation." Also according to same article: "O’Neill said that as APEC host, he would release a Chairman’s Statement, though it was not clear when." O'Neill said that the talks broke down over language about the World Trade Organization while Reuters reported that the cause for the impasse was disagreement on portions of the draft communique relating to the WTO which mentioned opposing "unfair trade practices" and reforming the WTO, while another concerned sustainable development.

Security
Much of the security for the meeting was provided by the Australian Defence Force (ADF) at an estimated cost of AUD130 million. The Papua New Guinea Government passed special legislation which gave unprecedented powers to foreign forces and security personnel to protect visiting leaders. The ADF supplied about 1500 personnel with airspace security provided by the Royal Australian Air Force and maritime security support provided by the Royal Australian Navy. 

Other nations to provide security support to the summit included New Zealand, the United States, China, Canada, Japan and Indonesia. In total, about 2000 foreign military personnel were involved.

The New Zealand Defence Force provided the offshore Patrol Vessel HMNZS Otago with about 75 crew to assist with maritime security, a P-3 Orion detachment with 20 personnel to provide aerial surveillance, and up to 30 Special Operation Forces personnel.  The United States Coast Guard provided in shore security in Port Moresby.

References

External links

2018 in economics
Economy of Papua New Guinea
21st-century diplomatic conferences (Asia-Pacific)
2018 in international relations
2018 conferences
2018
2018 in Papua New Guinea
November 2018 events in Oceania